The 1955 Victorian state election was held on 28 May 1955.

Seat changes
There was a redistribution of boundaries in 1955. In consequence:
Allandale Country MLA Russell White contested Ballarat North.
Ballarat Labor MLA John Sheehan contested Ballarat South.
Barwon LCP MLA Thomas Maltby contested Geelong.
Borung LCP MLA Wilfred Mibus contested Lowan.
Brunswick Anti-Communist MLA Peter Randles contested Brunswick West.
Clifton Hill Anti-Communist MLA Joseph O'Carroll contested Brunswick East.
Dandenong Labor MLA Les Coates contested Moorabbin.
Essendon Anti-Communist MLA George Fewster contested Pascoe Vale.
Footscray Labor MLA Jack Holland contested Flemington.
Geelong Independent Labor MLA James Dunn contested Geelong West.
Gippsland North Labor MLA Hector Stoddart contested Morwell.
Glen Iris VLP MLA Thomas Hollway contested Ripponlea.
Goulburn Labor MLA Joseph Smith contested Broadmeadows.
Korong LCP MLA Keith Turnbull contested Kara Kara.
Ivanhoe Anti-Communist MLA Michael Lucy contested Evelyn.
Mernda Anti-Communist MLA Edmund Morrissey contested Reservoir.
Preston Labor MLA William Ruthven contested Reservoir.
Ripon Labor MLA Ernie Morton contested Hampden.
Sunshine Labor MLA Ernie Shepherd contested Ascot Vale.
Warrnambool Labor MLA Malcolm Gladman contested Portland.

Retiring Members

Labor
Robert Holt MLA (Portland)
John Lemmon MLA (Williamstown)

Country
William Buckingham MLA (Wonthaggi)
Keith Dodgshun MLA (Rainbow)

Legislative Assembly
Sitting members are shown in bold text. Successful candidates are highlighted in the relevant colour. Where there is possible confusion, an asterisk (*) is also used.

See also
1955 Victorian Legislative Council election

References

Psephos - Adam Carr's Election Archive

Victoria
Candidates for Victorian state elections